John Glenn High School is a public high school located in Norwalk, California and part of the Norwalk-La Mirada Unified School District. Its athletics participate in the 605 League of the CIF Southern Section. The school colors are red, white, and blue. The school's team nickname is the Eagles. The school was named after astronaut and future U.S. senator John Glenn. Current administrators are Principal Jennifer Padilla, and assistant principals include Shannon Cruz,Orlando Beltran,and Paulette Gasporra. Glenn High School opened in 1963. First graduating class was 1965.

Notable alumni
 Joseph Marquez (class of 2010) - professional Super Smash Bros. Melee player, better known as Mango
 Tommy Moore (class of 1967) - MLB pitcher
 Bob Newton (class of 1967) - NFL player
 Tom Maggard (class of 1968) - 1st round draft pick by the Boston Red Sox in the 1968 Major League Baseball Draft

References

External links

 

High schools in Los Angeles County, California
Public high schools in California
Norwalk, California
1962 establishments in California